Luis Jaime Carvajal y Salas (born 29 October 1942) is a Spanish equestrian. He competed in the team jumping event at the 1972 Summer Olympics.

References

External links
 
 

1942 births
Living people
Spanish male equestrians
Olympic equestrians of Spain
Equestrians at the 1972 Summer Olympics
Competitors at the 1979 Mediterranean Games
Place of birth missing (living people)
Mediterranean Games bronze medalists for Spain
Mediterranean Games medalists in equestrian